Illya Woloshyn  was a Canadian former actor of Ukrainian descent.

He started acting at a very young age, playing the role of Jacob in Jacob Two-Two Meets the Hooded Fang at Young People's Theatre in Toronto, and later Gavroche in the original Toronto production of Les Misérables at the Royal Alexandra Theatre in 1988. He did later join the touring production and performed the role in theatres across Canada.

After leaving Les Misérables, he landed the role of Jay in the national Canadian television series The Odyssey in 1992.

Woloshyn retired from acting in 1999.  He passed away on January 23, 2023.

Acting credits 
Vanished Without a Trace (1999) as Johnny
Letters to a Street Child (1999) as Derek
The Odyssey (1992-1995) as Jay Ziegler
Are You Afraid of the Dark? (1993) as Augie Wilson
Hush Little Baby (1993) as Dylan
Forever Knight (1992) as Daniel
Beethoven Lives Upstairs (1992) as Christoph
I'll Never Get to Heaven (1992) as Mario
The Kids in the Hall (1992)
Johann's Gift to Christmas (1991) as Johann
War of the Worlds (1989) as Torri
Friday the 13th: The Series (1989) as Danny Green
The Twilight Zone (1988) as Chad Judson
Night Heat (1988)
A Nest of Singing Birds (1987) as Gregor
The Last Season (1986) as Tommy Shannon

References

External links 

1979 births
Living people
Canadian male film actors
Canadian male television actors
Canadian people of Ukrainian descent
Canadian male child actors
Television child actors